Francis Peter Williams (1 October 1914 – 14 July 2005) was an Australian rules footballer who played with the Carlton and Melbourne in the Victorian Football League (VFL).

Notes

External links 

1914 births
2005 deaths
Carlton Football Club players
Melbourne Football Club players
Australian rules footballers from Victoria (Australia)
University Blacks Football Club players